Pierella is a butterfly genus from the subfamily Satyrinae in the family Nymphalidae found from Mexico through Central America to South America. The species of Pierella have larger hindwings than forewings, unique among butterflies. The oval green flash on the forewing is also unique. It is caused by diffraction, the wing scales forming a diffraction grating.

Their caterpillars have been found on the host plants Heliconia and Calathea.

Species and subspecies 
 Pierella amalia Weymer, 1885 (= P. lena ab. leucospila)
 Pierella astyoche (Erichson, [1849]) – Astyoche satyr
 Pierella astyoche astyoche (= Haetera larymna, Hetaera [sic] astyoche)
 Pierella astyoche bernhardina Bryk, 1953 (= P. astyoche f. obscura (nomen nudum))
 Pierella astyoche stollei Ribeiro, 1931
 Pierella helvina (Hewitson, 1859)
 Pierella helvina helvina (= Haetera helvina) – red-washed satyr
 Pierella helvina hymettia Staudinger, [1886] (= P. incanescens werneri)
 Pierella helvina incanescens Godman & Salvin, 1877 (= P. incanescens costaricana)
 Pierella helvina ocreata Salvin & Godman, 1868 (= P. ocreata (nomen nudum))
 Pierella helvina pacifica Niepelt, 1924 (= Pierello  ocreata johnsoni)
 Pierella hortona (Hewitson, 1854) – white-barred lady slipper
 Pierella hortona hortona (= Haetera hortensia, Haetera hortona, P. hortona f. albopunctata, P. hortona f. ocellata)
 Pierella hortona albofasciata Rosenberg & Talbot, 1914 (= P. albofaciata  decepta)
 Pierella hyalinus (Gmelin, [1790]) – glassy pierella
 Pierella hyalinus hyalinus (= Papilio hyalinus, Pierella hyalinus fusimaculata, Pieris dracontis)
 Pierella hyalinus extincta Weymer, 1910
 Pierella hyalinus schmidti Constantino, 1995
 Pierella hyalinus velezi Constantino, 1995
 Pierella hyceta (Hewitson, 1859) – golden lady slipper
 Pierella hyceta hyceta (= Haetera hyceta)
 Pierella hyceta ceryce (Hewitson, 1874) (= Haetera ceryce)
 Pierella hyceta latona (C.Felder & R.Felder, 1867) (= Haetera latona)
Pierella incanescens (Godman & Salvin, 1877)
 Pierella lamia (Sulzer, 1776) – Sulzer's lady slipper
 Pierella lamia lamia (= Papilio dyndimene, Papilio lamia, Papilio rhea, Pierella lamia f. fabriciana , Pierella luna ab. albina)
 Pierella lamia boliviana F.M.Brown, 1948
 Pierella lamia chalybaea Godman, 1905 (=  Haetera lamia f. columbina)
 Pierella lena (Linnaeus, 1767) – Lena pierella
 Pierella lena lena (= Papilio lena, Papilio sectator)
 Pierella lena brasiliensis (C.Felder & R.Felder, 1862) (= Haetera brasiliensis, P. lena browni, P. lena glaucolena, P. lena f. melanosa (nomen nudum), P. lena f. obsoleta)
 Pierella lucia Weymer, 1885 (= P. astyoche var. albomaculata) – Lucia pierella
 Pierella luna (Fabricius, 1793) – Moon Satyr
 Pierella luna luna (= Papilio luna, Pierella luna f. rubra)
 Pierella luna lesbia Staudinger, 1887
 Pierella luna pallida (Salvin & Godman, 1868) (= Hetaera  pallida)
 Pierella luna rubecula Salvin & Godman, 1868 (= Haetera heracles)
 Pierella nereis (Drury, 1782) (= Papilio nereis)

References 

  Nymphalidae Study Group species list
Urich, F. C., and T. C. Emmel. 1990. Life histories of Neotropical butterflies from Trinidad 1. Pierella hyalinus fusimaculata (Lepidoptera: Satyridae). Tropical Lepidoptera 1(1): 25-26.pdf

External links

Barcode of life Images

Haeterini
Nymphalidae of South America
Butterfly genera
Taxa named by John O. Westwood